Berkutov is a Russian masculine surname, its feminine counterpart is Berkutova. Notable people with the surname include:

Alexander Berkutov (born 1986), Russian ice hockey defenceman
Aleksandr Berkutov (1933–2012), Russian rower

Russian-language surnames